The Sooner State League was a Class D level minor league baseball league that operated from 1947 through 1957. The league owners kept it alive in 1958, anticipating a return to play in 1959. However, when only Ardmore and Paris, Texas, were able to secure working agreements, the league folded on February 12, 1959. It was the last Class D  league west of the Mississippi River. The league franchises were based in Oklahoma and Texas.

Cities represented 
Ada, OK: Ada Herefords 1947–1954; Ada Cementers (August 3, 1954–season end)
Ardmore, OK: Ardmore Indians 1947–1952; Ardmore Cardinals 1953–1957.
Chickasha, OK: Chickasha Chiefs 1948–1952  
Duncan, OK: Duncan Cementers – 1947–1948; Duncan Uttmen 1949–1950  
Gainesville, TX: Gainesville Owls 1953–1955 
Greenville, TX: Greenville Majors 1957.
Lawton, OK: Lawton Giants 1947–1951; Lawton Reds 1952–1953; Lawton Braves 1954–1957 
McAlester, OK: McAlester Rockets 1947–1956 
Muskogee, OK: Muskogee Giants 1955–1957
Paris, TX: Paris Orioles 1955–1957 
Pauls Valley, OK: Pauls Valley Raiders 1948–1954 
Ponca City, OK: Ponca City Cubs 1955–1957 
Seminole, OK: Seminole Oilers 1947–1949; Seminole Ironmen 1950–1951; Seminole Oilers 1954–1957 
Shawnee, OK: Shawnee Hawks 1950–1957 
Sherman, TX & Denison, TX: Sherman Twins 1952; Sherman-Denison Twins 1953

Standings & statistics

1947 to 1952
 Playoffs: Ardmore 3 games, Lawton 2; McAlester 3 games, Ada 2; Finals: McAlester 4 games, Ardmore 1. 
 
1948 schedule 
 Playoffs: McAlester 3 games, Chickasha 1; Seminole 3 games, Lawton 2; Finals: Seminole 4 games, McAlester 2. 
 
1949 schedule
 Playoffs: Pauls Valley 3 games, Ada 2; Lawton 3 games, Chickasha 0; Finals: Lawton 4 games, Pauls Valley 1. 
 
Duncan moved to Shawnee August 18. Playoffs: Ardmore 3 games, Ada 2; McAlester 3 games, Chickasha 0; Finals: McAlester 4 games, Ardmore 2. 
 
 Playoffs: Ardmore 3 games, Pauls Valley 0; McAlester 3 games, Shawnee 0; Finals: McAlester 4 games, Ardmore 2. 
 
 Playoffs: McAlester 3 games, Shawnee 1; Pauls Valley 3 games, Chickasha 1; Finals: McAlester 4 games, Pauls Valley 3.

1953 to 1955 
 Playoffs: McAlester 3 games, Ardmore 1; Ada 3 games, Shawnee 1; Finals: McAlester 4 games, Ada 1. 
 
 Playoffs: Ardmore 3 games, Shawnee 2; Lawton 3 games, McAlester 2; Finals: Lawton 4 games, Ardmore 0.
 
Gainesville moved to Ponca City May 19. Playoffs: Lawton 3 games, Paris 1; Muskogee 3 games, Shawnee 2; Finals: Lawton 4 games, Muskogee 2.

1956 to 1957 
1956 schedule
 Playoffs: Ardmore 3 games, Paris 2; Seminole 3 games, Lawton 1; Finals: Seminole 4 games, Ardmore 3. 
 
1957 schedule
 Playoffs: Paris 3 games, Shawnee 1; Ardmore 3 games, Muskogee 0; Finals: Ardmore 4 games, Paris 0.

Hall of Fame alumni 
Whitey Herzog, 1949–1950 McAlester Rockets 
Travis Jackson, 1954–1957 Manager Lawton Braves 
Billy Williams, 1956–1957 Ponca City Cubs

References 
 McCann, M. (n.d.). Minor League Baseball History. Retrieved April 27, 2007, from https://www.webcitation.org/query?url=http://www.geocities.com/big_bunko/soonerstate4757.htm&date=2009-10-25+13:34:10
Pierce, Peter G., Baseball in the Cross Timbers: The Story of the Sooner State League (Oklahoma Heritage Association 2009)

Defunct professional sports leagues in the United States
Defunct minor baseball leagues in the United States
Baseball in Oklahoma
Sports leagues established in 1947
Sports leagues disestablished in 1957
Baseball leagues in Oklahoma
Baseball leagues in Texas